The Czilim-class ACV (Project 20910) is a small patrol hovercraft operated by the Border Guard Service of Russia.

Configuration 
The Czilim class is the first new class of military hovercraft developed for the Russian military since the fall of the Soviet Union. It is based on an Almaz design and was ordered from Jaroslawski Sudostroiteinyj Zawod in the late 1990s. It is roughly the same size as the British SR.N6 hovercraft.

The Czilim class was designed for border patrol duties on the Amur River on the border with China, and is expected to be used entirely by Russian Border Guards. It is intended as a smaller replacement for the Soviet . The first craft was laid down on 24 February 1998 and entered service in early 2001. Three further craft were built at Yaroslavl between 1997 and 1999. Four were in service in 2004, though none are believed to be currently operational.

The Czilim class is capable of carrying six Border Guards and their equipment.

See also
 List of ships of the Soviet Navy
 List of ships of Russia by project number

References 
 
 All Czilim class ACV - Complete Ship List

Ships of the Border Guard Service of Russia
Military hovercraft